The Winner is Nepali action based film released on 4 November 2016 directed by Hikmat Bista and produced by Srijana Shah and Bikash Kharel. The film features Malina Joshi , Manchin Shakya and  Mahesh Man Shrestha in lead roles.
Filmed in Nepal, Australia, Dubai, The first look of the film was released in Baishak 10. The film was released from 2 September 2016/ Bhadra 17 2073.

Cast
Malina Joshi
 Manchin Shakya 
 Mahesh Man Shrestha
 Reshu Tamang
 Rajkumar Pant
 Royal Maskey
 Amit Giri
 Shaun. Anthony Robinson.

References

2010s Nepali-language films
Nepalese action films
2016 action films